Thallium(I) iodide is a chemical compound with the formula TlI. It is unusual in being one of the few water-insoluble metal iodides, along with AgI, CuI, SnI2, SnI4, PbI2 and HgI2.

Chemistry
TlI can be formed in aqueous solution by metathesis of any soluble thallium salt with iodide ion. It is also formed as a by-product in thallium-promoted iodination of phenols with thallium(I) acetate.

Attempts to oxidise TlI to thallium(III) iodide fail, since oxidation produces thallium(I) triiodide, .

Physical properties
The room temperature form of TlI is yellow and has an orthorhombic structure  which can be considered to be a distorted NaCl structure. The distorted structure is believed to be caused by favourable thallium-thallium interactions, the closest Tl-Tl distance is 383 pm. At 175 °C the yellow form transforms to a red CsCl form. This phase transition is accompanied by about two orders of magnitude jump in electrical conductivity. The CsI structure can be stabilized down to room temperature by doping  with other halides such as RbI, CsI, KI, AgI, TlBr and TlCl. Thus, presence of impurities might be responsible for coexistence of the cubic and orthorombic  phases at ambient conditions. Under high pressure, 160 kbar,  becomes a metallic conductor. Nanometer-thin  films grown on LiF, NaCl or KBr substrates exhibit the cubic rocksalt structure.

Applications
Thallium(I) iodide was initially added to mercury arc lamps to improve their performance The light produced was mainly in the blue green part of the visible light spectrum least absorbed by water, so these have been used for underwater lighting. In modern times, it is added to quartz and ceramic metal halide lamps that uses rare-earth halides like dysprosium, to increase their efficiency and to get the light color more close to the blackbody locus. Thallium iodide alone can be used to produces green colored metal halide lamps. Thallium(I) iodide is also used in trace amounts with NaI or CsI to produce scintillators used in radiation detectors.

Natural occurrence
Natural thallium(I) iodide was first discovered in a naturally occurring setting in 2017 as a orthorhombic polymorph called nataliyamalikite. The geologists that discovered it speculate that further research into this mineral is likely to add to the understanding of the geochemical evolution of the planet

Safety
Like all thallium compounds, thallium(I) iodide is highly toxic.

References

Cited sources

Iodides
Thallium(I) compounds
Metal halides